CAAX box protein 1 is a protein that in humans is encoded by the FAM127A gene.

References

Further reading